Michael Esposito is an experimental artist and researcher in Electronic Voice Phenomena (EVP).

Biography

Michael Andrew Esposito was born in Gary, Indiana in 1964.  He is a descendant of Alfred Vail who invented the Morse Code and several early telegraph devices with his partner Samuel Morse. The invention of the telegraph sparked the spiritualist movement of the middle 1800s and the telegraph was used in spirit communication. Another ancestor, Jonathan Harned Vail was office manager and assistant to Thomas Edison. In his later years, Edison attempted to develop a device for communicating with the dead. Michael studied communication theory at Purdue University, University of Notre Dame, American University in Cairo, Egypt and Governor's State University. During the Gulf War Michael was a Psy-ops officer in Iraq.

Over the years, under the Phantom Airwaves institution, Michael has participated in hundreds of paranormal investigations all over the world. He has conducted extensive research at many active locations and has developed a great deal of unique theory and devised many unique experiments within the field of EVP. Focusing primarily on EVP research, he has collected tens of thousands EVPs and video.  He has had numerous television, radio and newspaper appearances.

Working extensively with EVP's relationship to experimental music, Michael combines EVP with field recording and related frequency tones of research sites.
Michael is currently published by Touch (UK).

Selected Discography

 Unsure (2006)
 Perryville Battlefield (2007)
 The Summerhouse (CD) w/ Leif Elggren (2007)
 Fire Station 6 (CD) w/ Leif Elggren (2008)
 The Sallie House (CD) w/ F.M. Einheit (2008)
 Enemy (CD) w/ Brent Gutzeit (2009)
 The John Mouat Lumbermill Tests (2009)
 The Old Vicarage - Gamla Prästgården (CD) w/ Carl Michael von Hausswolff (2009)
 Der Geist Meiner Mutter (2010)
 Messerschmitt  (2010)
 The Ghosts of Effingham (Cylinder Phonograph Record) w/ Carl Michael von Hausswolff (2010)
 The Icy Echoer (7") w/ Kevin Drumm (2010)
 There Must Be A Way Across This River / The Abject (LP) w/ John Duncan and Z'EV (2011)
 Nothing By Mouth - Old South Pittsburg Hospital Test w/ Heidi Harman (2011)
 The Ghosts of Ogilvie Station (7" Flexi) w/ Per Svensson (2011)
 The Ghosts of Case File 142 (CD) w/ Francisco Meirino (2012)
 The Phantoms of Purgatory Souls (7" Flexi) w/ Chris Connelly (2012)
 The Maladjusted Of Manteno Asylum - Artist's Multiple version (7" One Of a Kind Vinyl + Acoustic Paper Turntable + E.Book + Phantom Monograph article + handmade signed and numbered by the author) w/ Patrick Esposito | Published by: Radical Matters - Editions / Label | 2012.
 The Maladjusted Of Manteno Asylum - Sound Object version (One Side Glue Reocord + CDR + E.Book) w/ Patrick Esposito | Published by: Radical Matters - Editions / Label | 2012.

Filmography

 Dead Whisper (2006)
 Paranormal Labs: Ghosts - Dead Whisper (2008)
 The House  (2008)
 Ghost Asylum (2009)
 The Sallie House - Gateway to the Paranormal (2009)
 Dead Whisper: In Search of Ghosts and the Supernatural (2009)

Notes

External links
 Discogs
 News Article Michael Esposito

1964 births
Living people
Paranormal investigators
People from Gary, Indiana
Purdue University alumni
University of Notre Dame alumni
The American University in Cairo alumni